The 5.28 cm SK L/55 was a German naval gun that was used before and during World War I on a variety of mounts, in torpedo boats and cruisers.

Design and description
The 5.2 cm SK L/55 gun was designed around 1905, and used fixed ammunition. The gun was of built-up steel construction with a central rifled tube, reinforcing hoops from the trunnions to the breech. The gun used a semi-automatic Krupp horizontal sliding-block breech and used fixed quick fire ammunition.

Service 
This gun was installed in several torpedo boats and cruisers of the Imperial German Navy, as well as in some torpedo boats ordered by the Royal Netherlands Navy, among them:

 SMS V106 torpedo boat (ex-Dutch)
 A-class torpedo boat (coastal)
 S90-class torpedo boat (ocean-going)
 Dresden-class cruiser
 Kolberg-class cruiser
 Königsberg-class cruiser
 Pillau-class cruiser
 Wiesbaden-class cruiser

During World War I it was sometimes replaced with larger guns (as the 8.8 cm L/30, 8.8 cm L/35 or 8.8 cm L/45), while in turn replaced the less powerful 5 cm SK L/40 gun in some older torpedo boats.

See also

 List of naval guns

References

Bibliography

Further reading

External links
 5.2 cm/55 (2.05") SK L/55 - History and specifications, at Naval Weapons of the World website (NavWeaps.com) (accessed 2016-08-27)

Naval guns of Germany
World War I naval weapons